City & State is a political journalism organization based in New York City. The company publishes a weekly magazine covering politics and government in New York City and New York State that is distributed to New York State legislators, county executives, municipalities, the New York Congressional delegation, New York City Council members and others leaders in New York business and government. After years of publishing a twice-monthly print edition, City & State has announced plans to switch to a weekly in January 2016. City & State also publishes on their website and sends out a free First Read daily email. In May 2016 the company also launched a monthly magazine based in Philadelphia and a website.

Tom Allon is the organization's president and CEO. In 2021, City & State was acquired by Government Executive Media Group.

History

City Hall (2006-2011) 
City Hall was a monthly newspaper and website started by Manhattan Media in June 2006, that covered New York City politics and policy. With free distribution around City Hall and other government buildings, the publication quickly became a must-read for New York City government and business leaders.

The Capitol (2008-2011) 
After the success of City Hall, Manhattan Media launched The Capitol in print and online in January 2008. The Capitol was published twice monthly during the New York State legislative session (January – June), and became a monthly publication in the off-months (July – December). The Capitol was direct mailed and hand delivered to New York State legislators in Albany, with a free circulation in Albany news boxes and other government buildings around New York State.

During the official launch of The Capitol in Albany in March 2008, Editor Edward-Isaac Dovere was interviewing then-New York State Senate Majority leader Malcolm Smith when news broke of Gov. Eliot Spitzer's resignation.

City & State (December 2011) 
City & State is a bi-monthly news magazine formed in December 2011 by the merger of City Hall and The Capitol. This print publication is delivered to members of the governor's office, the New York State Legislature, county executives, the New York City Council and various other elected officials, public officials and leaders in business and advocacy around New York State.

First Read (July 2011) 
The First Read daily morning round up of news clippings from around New York City and New York State was launched in July 2011 from an existing subscriber list of roughly 8,000 people working in and around government. The reformat was developed by Editor-in-chief Adam Lisberg and Publisher Darren Bloch. Since First Read's re-launch it has grown to over 20,000 subscribers, and has been hailed by New York City Mayor Michael Bloomberg, who said: “My first read is Bloomberg View … but my second read every morning is City & State’s First Read.”

Accolades 

 2016 - New York Press Association - Feature Story - 1st place
 2016 - New York Press Association - Coverage of Elections/Politics - 1st place
 2016 - New York Press Association - Best News or Feature Series - 1st place
 2016 - New York Press Association - Best News or Feature Series - 3rd place
 2016 - New York Press Association - Best Special Section Cover - 3rd place

References

External links 
 

Organizations based in New York City
Newspapers published in New York City
Political magazines published in the United States
Politics of New York (state)
Politics of New York City